Teng Haibin (born January 2, 1985, in Beijing) is a male Chinese gymnast. He is a Two Time World Champion as well as an Olympic gold medalist on the pommel horse. He cost his team a medal at the 2004 Olympics with multiple falls on every apparatus (except his specialty pommel horse). He and Xiao Qin are considered personal favorites of Head Coach Huang Yubin.

He is married to Olympics all-around bronze medalist, Zhang Nan.

See also
 Gymnastics at the 2004 Summer Olympics

References

External links
 
 Teng Haibin (Parallel Bars)
 
 

1985 births
Living people
Chinese male artistic gymnasts
Gymnasts at the 2004 Summer Olympics
Medalists at the World Artistic Gymnastics Championships
Olympic gold medalists for China
Olympic gymnasts of China
Gymnasts from Beijing
World champion gymnasts
Olympic medalists in gymnastics
Medalists at the 2004 Summer Olympics
Asian Games medalists in gymnastics
Gymnasts at the 2002 Asian Games
Gymnasts at the 2010 Asian Games
Asian Games gold medalists for China
Asian Games bronze medalists for China
Medalists at the 2002 Asian Games
Medalists at the 2010 Asian Games
21st-century Chinese people